Ilfracombe is a coastal rural community on the South Coast of KwaZulu-Natal, South Africa and forms part of the eThekwini Metropolitan Municipality.

Geography  
Ilfracombe is located approximately 45 km south of Durban and is accessible by rail and by roads including the N2 freeway (to Durban and Port Shepstone) and the coastal R102 (to Umkomaas and Umgababa). It lies between Umkomaas which is on the opposite side of the uMkomazi River in the south and Umgababa in the north. Ilfracombe is today known as an extension or suburb of Umkomaas.

East Coast Brewing Company

Ilfracombe is home to the East Coast Brewing Company's brewhouse which focuses on core beer styles such as Lagers & Session Indian Pale Ales, releasing seasonal beers according to the season. The company also hosts an annual Oktoberfest at the Tap Room on its property.

References 

Populated places in eThekwini Metropolitan Municipality